Marília Dias Mendonça (22 July 1995 – 5 November 2021) was a Brazilian singer, songwriter and instrumentalist. She is posthumously recognized in Brazil as the 'queen of sofrência', a subgenre of sertanejo music, and has been recognized for her contribution to female empowerment by revolutionizing the universe of sertanejo music.

In 2015, she released her self-titled debut EP. She rose to prominence after releasing her first eponymous live album in 2016, which was certified triple platinum in Brazil for selling 240,000 copies. "Infiel", a song included in the album, became one of the most played songs in Brazil and received a triple diamond disc certificate, giving Mendonça national visibility. Her second live album Realidade, was released in 2017 and received a Latin Grammy nomination in the Best Sertaneja Music Album. In 2019, she released the live album Todos os Cantos, which featured shows recorded by the singer in all the state capitals. The album was certified triple platinum by Pro-Música Brasil with 240,000 copies sold and received a Latin Grammy for Best Sertaneja Music Album.

On 5 November 2021, Mendonça died at the age of 26 in an airplane crash in Piedade de Caratinga, Minas Gerais, where she was to perform a concert.

Biography

Early life 
Born in Cristianópolis and raised in Goiânia, Mendonça had her first contact with music through church and began composing when she was 12, having started to write songs for various singers such as "Minha Herança" (João Neto & Frederico), "Muito Gelo, Pouco Whisky" (Wesley Safadão), "Até Você Voltar", "Cuida Bem Dela", "Flor e o Beija-Flor" (Henrique & Juliano), "Ser Humano ou um Anjo" (Matheus & Kauan), "Calma" (Jorge & Mateus) and "É Com Ela Que Eu Estou" (Cristiano Araújo).

2011–16:  Marília Mendonça  
Mendonça started her career as a singer in January 2014, with her first eponymous EP. In June 2015, the song "Impasse" was released, Mendonça's first single which featured the participation of duo Henrique & Juliano. In March 2016, Mendonça released her first live album called Marília Mendonça: Ao Vivo which featured singles such as "Sentimento Louco" and "Infiel" with the participation of Henrique & Juliano. Infiel became the fifth most played song on Brazilian radio that year, and Mendonça began to gain national recognition. In October, a live acoustic EP entitled Agora É Que São Elas was released with previous successful tracks and had its only single with the song "Eu Sei de Cor".

2017–2018: Realidade and Agora É Que São Elas

In January 2017, Mendonça released another eponymous EP with four new tracks. In March, her second album was released entitled Realidade, which had singles such as "Amante Não Tem Lar" and "De Quem É A Culpa" and counted again with participation of the duo Henrique & Juliano. In November, she released the single "Transplante" in partnership with duo Bruno & Marrone. In July, Mendonça won the post of the most heard Brazilian artist on YouTube, ranking 13th in the world ranking.

In April 2018, she released the album entitled Agora É Que São Elas 2, in collaboration with the duo Maiara & Maraisa. The album features the songs "Ausência" and "Estranho", in addition to "A Culpa é Dele".

2019–2021: Todos os Cantos and Patroas 
In February 2019, the first part of Mendonça's third live album, entitled Todos os Cantos, was released; singles in this album included the songs "Ciumeira", "Bem Pior Que Eu", "Todo Mundo Vai Sofrer" and "Supera". In March, Spotify announced that Mendonça was number one in the TOP 10 of the most heard women in Brazil of the streaming service. In May, the second part of the album Todos os Cantos was released. The third and final part of the live album was released in August. In 2019, Todos os Cantos won the Latin Grammy Award for Best Sertaneja Music Album.

In January 2020, Mendonça released the single "Graveto". In February, she released another single "Tentativas". In May, her third single of the year "Vira Homem" was released. In September, she released the album titled Patroas, in partnership with the duo Maiara & Maraisa . The album features unreleased compositions by the singers and re-recordings of their greatest hits. Their songs included "Quero Você do Jeito Que Quiser", "10 de Setembro" and "Coração Bandido". In 2021, it was nominated for a Latin Grammy Award for Best Sertaneja Music Album. On 22 August 2021, singer Luísa Sonza released a remix of the song "Best Sozinha" featuring Mendonça.

In October 2021, Mendonça released a studio album titled Patroas 35%, another collaboration between Mendonça and the duo Maiara & Maraisa. The album features the songs "Todo Mundo Menos Você", "Esqueça-Me Se For Capaz" and "Motel Afrodite".

Posthumous releases 
After Mendonça's death, songs that she had recorded with other artists were released, such as "Amigos con Derechos" with Mexican singer Dulce María, "50 por Cento" with singer Naiara Azevedo, "Amava Nada" with singer Lucas Lucco, "Calculista" with duo Dom Vittor & Gustavo and "Mal Feito" with duo Hugo & Guilherme.

On 21 July 2022, Mendonça first posthumous EP titled Decretos Reais, Vol. 1 was released.

Personal life 
In March 2015, Mendonça dated businessman Yugnir Ângelo, with whom she became engaged in December 2016. She ended the relationship in August 2017, stating she was too young for such a commitment. After maintaining casual relationships, in May 2019 she revealed she had been in a serious relationship for five months with fellow singer and songwriter Murilo Huff. The couple got engaged and moved in together. In June the same year, she confirmed that she was pregnant, giving birth to her son Léo, born eight weeks premature, on 16 December 2019, in Goiânia.

During the break of her Side B live show, on 8 August 2020, Mendonça mentioned a gay nightclub in Goiânia called Diesel, where one of her band's musicians had kissed "the most beautiful woman in his life", according to her. In addition, other members of the band chuckled and made unspoken comments, implying that the boy would have hooked up with a transsexual woman. The singer's comments had a negative impact on social networks and raised the hashtag #MaríliaTransfóbica on Twitter. On 10 August, Mendonça spoke on Twitter and admitted the mistake, where she apologized for the jokes and acknowledged that her mistake was unjustifiable.

Death 

On 5 November 2021, Mendonça embarked on an air taxi with four other people on board towards Caratinga, Minas Gerais, Brazil, where she was expected to perform in a local concert. The plane crashed, killing Mendonça, her uncle (who was also her manager), her producer and two crew members. All five deaths were officially confirmed shortly after on a live coverage by TV Globo. Her death attracted great attention of national and international media, and several artists mourned the tragedy and paid their respects on social media, such as Anitta, Luísa Sonza, Dulce María, Gal Costa, Roberta Miranda, Gilberto Gil, Ivete Sangalo, Pabllo Vittar, among others and from Manuel Abud, CEO of the Latin Recording Academy.

After her death, Mendonça became the most listened-to artist in global streamings with 28.6 million streams; 74 of her songs appeared in Spotify's TOP200 in Brazil.

Funeral 
With the exception of the pilot and co-pilot, the victims' bodies left the funeral home in Caratinga, at dawn on 6 November. At morning, the bodies of Mendonça and Silveira arrived in Goiânia. An open casket service for them took place at Goiânia Arena in Goiânia later that day. Their private funeral was held at 9:00 am, restricted to family members; it later opened to the public at 1:00 pm, and fans were allowed to pay their respects. It is estimated that more than 100,000 people passed through the arena. Funeral procession began at 5:30 pm, with the bodies being buried at Cemitério Parque Memorial in Goiânia.

Legacy
Mendonça is recognized as the leader of the musical subgenre feminejo — sertanejo music that emphasizes women – and her contribution to female empowerment. The singer revolutionized the sertanejo scene between the 2010s and 2020s. She was often called the queen of suffering, for her soulful, angst-filled ballads.

Recognition
Mendonça continues to be remembered in numerous tributes and memorials. At the 64th Annual Grammy Awards, she appeared in the in Memoriam segment, in which tributes are paid to people related to the music industry who died during the course of the year, appearing in this section of the award a photo of the artist side by side with Taylor Hawkins and Stephen Sondheim.

To immortalize the history of Mendonça, the Mercado da 74 de Goiânia began to carry her name since 21 October 2022, becoming the Mercado Popular Cultural Center of Rua 74 Marília Mendonça. In Caratinga, the city where Mendonça was going to perform at the time of her accident, the singer has been honored annually on the date she died, and is in the process of changing the name of the João da Costa Mafra Exhibition Park to Marília Mendonça and João da Costa Mafra Exhibition Park. Singer Emely Rodrigues also paid homage to Mendonça during the celebrations of São João, in Salvador, Bahia. The sertanejo duo Henrique & Juliano also honored Mendonça on the occasion of their DVD recording in the United States, moving the Times Square audience.

Discography

Awards and nominations

References

External links

 
 
 

1995 births
2021 deaths
People from Goiás
People from Goiânia
Brazilian women singer-songwriters
Brazilian singer-songwriters
Brazilian contraltos
Sertanejo musicians
21st-century Brazilian singers
21st-century Brazilian women singers
Latin Grammy Award winners
Som Livre artists
Victims of aviation accidents or incidents in 2021
Victims of aviation accidents or incidents in Brazil
Musicians killed in aviation_accidents or incidents
Women in Latin music